Cosio is a municipality and town in the Mexican state of Aguascalientes. The municipal seat is the town of Cosío. As of 2010, the town of Cosío had a population of 4,898.

Demographics

As of 2010, the municipality had a total population of 15,042.

As of 2010, the town of Cosío had a population of 4,898. Other than the town of Cosío, the municipality had 85 localities, the largest of which (with 2010 populations in parentheses) were: La Punta (2,416), El Refugio de Providencia (Providencia) (1,377), El Salero (1,229), and Santa María de la Paz (1,026), classified as rural.

Climate

References

External links
https://web.archive.org/web/20041011045925/http://www.aguascalientes.gob.mx/estado/m_cos.html

Municipalities of Aguascalientes